Plaza Nueva is a public square in the city center of Seville, Spain, containing the Seville City Hall. The land which the plaza is built on was formerly part of the San Fernando convent from 1270 to 1840. The land was later acquired by the local government and converted into a public square. The plaza was completed in 1856.

Name
The plaza has undergone a series of name changes since the beginning of its construction in 1852:
 1852: Plaza Nueva
 1857: Infanta Isabel
 1868: Plaza de la Libertad
 1873: Plaza de la República
 1875: Plaza de San Fernando
 1931: Plaza Nueva

History
Prior to the 11th century, the area that is now Plaza Nueva was part of the Guadalquivir river. In the 1981, while digging to construct the Seville Metro, remains of a 10th-century ship and a two-meter-long 6th century Byzantine anchor were found under the plaza.

By the 11th century the space was occupied by a cemetery and several orchards.

From 1270 to 1840 the convent Convento Casa Grande de San Francisco occupied the area that is now Plaza Nueva. The convent and its gardens extended beyond the bounds of where the modern-day plaza is located, reaching as far as present day Calle Zaragoza. During the occupation of Seville by Napoleonic troops in the 19th century, the convent suffered great structural damage, including a fire in 1810. In 1840, the government decided to acquire the land and demolish what remained of the convent.

The plaza was completed in 1856.

Monument of Ferdinand III of Castile in Seville

In the center of the plaza is an equestrian statue of Fernando III who conquered Seville for the Christians in 1248, and later was declared a saint by the Catholic church in 1671.

Since its construction, the designers of the plaza wanted to place a monument in the center of the plaza, thinking first of constructing a monument to Murillo and later thinking of erecting a statue of Isabella II.

It was finally decided on to build a monument to Fernando III in 1920. The monument is the work of Spanish architect Juan Talavera y Heredia and sculptor Joaquín Bilbao, and was inaugurated in August 1924.

Buildings

Casa consistorial de Sevilla

The city hall of Seville is located in the plaza, in the Casa consistorial de Sevilla building with an 18th-century façade.

Edificio de oficinas Philips, Seville
This office building was designed by Spanish architect Alfonso Toro Buiza.

Telefónica building
Seville's Telefónica building was designed in 1926 by Spanish architect Juan Talavera y Heredia. It utilizes Baroque architecture.

Capilla de San Onofre
The San Ofre Chapel is the only remaining part of the former convent that once occupied the plaza. Since 1520 it has been operated by Hermandad de las Ánimas de San Onofre.

The chapel contains four altarpieces:
Altarpiece titled Animas and the Virgen de la Candelaria
Altarpiece by Bernando Simon de Pineda with sculptures by Pedro Roldán
Altarpiece dedicated to Saint Laureano
Altarpiece commissioned in the sixteenth century for San Onofre

See also
Seville City Hall
Plaza de San Francisco, Seville

References

Tourist attractions in Seville
Plazas in Seville
1856 establishments in Spain